Charles Fitzgerald Robison (born September 1, 1964) is a retired American country music singer-songwriter. His brother, Bruce Robison, and his sister, Robyn Ludwick, are also singer-songwriters.

Career
After a knee injury at Southwest Texas State University ended a potential football career, Charlie Robison came to Austin, Texas in the late 1980s and had stints in the bands Chaparral, Millionaire Playboys, and Two Hoots and a Holler. He went solo with his album "Bandera" in 1996. He subsequently signed with Sony and released "Life of the Party" on Sony's subsidiary Lucky Dog Records. The album gave him three of his biggest hits including "My Hometown."  His next release was a live disc called "Unleashed Live," which is credited to Charlie, brother Bruce, and Jack Ingram. He then signed with Columbia Records for "Step Right Up" and another live album.

In 2003, Robison was a judge on the first season of the TV singing competition Nashville Star.

Unhappy with the expectations & limitations of being a Nashville country artist, he moved to a smaller independent label, Dualtone, for "Good Times" in 2004, followed by extensive touring and newfound control over his career. Accordingly, his sound began to evolve away from mainstream/Nashville country and toward more Southern & hard rock influences.

Five years after the release of Good Times, Robison released Beautiful Day on June 23, 2009, on Dualtone. This is the first CD he has self-produced. Both albums feature several songs written by Nashville singer-songwriter Keith Gattis.

His song "Good Times" was featured in the credits of HBO's original series True Blood in the first season's third episode.

In 2009, he embarked on an East Coast tour with stops in Little Rock, Nashville, Atlanta, Raleigh, New York City, Philadelphia, Chicago, Minneapolis, Iowa City, and Memphis to promote "Beautiful Day." Since then he has played primarily in Texas, with occasional shows in Louisiana, Arkansas, Oklahoma, and Colorado.

He is known for playing classic rock covers during his live shows. Some of these include: "You Shook Me All Night Long" and "Highway to Hell" (AC/DC), "Call me the Breeze" (JJ Cale), "Rocket Man" (Elton John), and several Rolling Stones songs, including "Dead Flowers" and "Honky Tonk Women." He also plays several songs associated with Willie Nelson, including "Whiskey River" and "Stay all Night."

His live band includes Mark Tokach (lead guitar), Abe Combest (Drums),  Zeke Benenate (bass) J.C. Burt (steel guitar) and Chris Valdez (road manager/additional guitar). Prior to Beautiful Day, his band was known as The Enablers and included Keith Robinson (drums), Scott Esbeck (bass) and Travis Woodard (drums).  Other notable members have included Kim Deschamps (pedal & lap steel, mandolin & guitar from 2000–2009), Kevin Carroll (guitar), Chris Grady (bass), Louis Landry (keyboards/accordion), and Kris Brown (bass). His recordings have also featured special guests Lloyd Maines (who produced Step Right Up and Good Times), Rich Brotherton, Charlie Sexton, and Natalie Maines (duet on "The Wedding Song" and harmony vocals on "El Cerrito Place").

In the fall of 2014, Charlie Robison opened Alamo Icehouse in San Antonio, Texas, with former MLB player, Brooks Kieschnick.

On September 24, 2018, Robison announced that due to complications from surgery, he was permanently unable to sing, and that he was regretfully officially retiring from stage and studio.
Hey amigos, Charlie here. I’m sure you’ve all been wondering where I’ve been. Well, at the beginning of this year I underwent a surgical procedure that because of complications left me with the permanent inability to sing. Therefore, with a very heavy heart I am officially retiring from the stage and studio. Gonna keep it short but just wanted y’all to hear it from me. It's been an amazing ride and I cannot tell you all what the last 25 years has meant to me. I was looking forward to another 25 but as they say "shit happens". I thank you all for everything you’ve given me and I hope I was able to give you a fraction of the happiness you gave me. It was a hell of a ride but as they say all good things must end. Keep on supporting this thing we call Texas/Red dirt and hopefully we’ll all get to have a cocktail or two and talk about the good ol days. Until then, Buenos Noches. It's been fun. Love each and every one of y’all.

Personal life
Robison married Emily Erwin of The Chicks at the Cibolo Creek Ranch in May 1999. They have three children together: Charles Augustus, called "Gus", born November 11, 2002, and twins Julianna Tex and Henry Benjamin, born on April 14, 2005. The couple divorced on August 6, 2008, after nine years of marriage.

Discography

Albums

Singles

Music videos

Tributes
He appeared on Kindred Spirits: A tribute to Johnny Cash, singing "Don't Take Your Guns to Town".

In 2006, Charlie Robison performed "Wildman from Borneo" on the Kinky Friedman tribute "Why the hell not..." The songs of Kinky Friedman.

See also 
 Music of Austin

References

External links
 Official website

1964 births
Living people
American country singer-songwriters
Judges in American reality television series
Participants in American reality television series
Country musicians from Texas
Musicians from Houston
Dualtone Records artists
Singer-songwriters from Texas
People from Bandera, Texas